Lomatium donnellii (Donnell's biscuitroot or glaucous desert parsley) is a perennial herb of the family Apiaceae, in the Western United States.

Taxonomy
Lomatium donnellii was first described in 1888 by John Merle Coulter and Joseph Nelson Rose as Peucedanum donnellii. In 1900, they transferred it to Lomatium. In 1889, they described Peucedanum plummerae, which they also transferred to Lomatium in 1900. , Plants of the World Online considers Lomatium plummerae and its variety helleri to be synonyms of Lomatium donnellii. In addition, the Jepson eFlora considers L. plummerae var. austiniae and var. sonnei to be synonyms of Lomatium donnellii, whereas Plants of the World Online considers them synonyms of Lomatium austiniae.

References

External links
  USDA Plants Profile for Lomatium donnellii (Donnell's biscuitroot)

donnellii
Endemic flora of the United States
Flora of California
Flora of Nevada
Flora of Oregon
Flora of the Northwestern United States
Flora of the Great Basin
Flora of the Sierra Nevada (United States)
Taxa named by John Merle Coulter
Flora without expected TNC conservation status